Vitebskiy may refer to:

Iosif Vitebskiy (born 1938), Soviet Ukrainian Olympic medalist and world champion fencer and fencing coach
Vitebskiy Kurier, Belarusian newspaper